Isnaraissah Munirah binti Majilis @ Fakharudy (Jawi: اغثنا الرئاسة منيرة بنت مجلس @ فخرالرضي; born 11 January 1982) is a Malaysian politician who served as the Deputy Minister of Energy, Science, Technology, Environment and Climate Change in the Pakatan Harapan (PH) administration under former Prime Minister Mahathir Mohamad and former Minister Yeo Bee Yin from July 2018 to the collapse of the PH administration in February 2020. She has served as the Member of Parliament (MP) for Kota Belud since May 2018.

Personal life 
Munirah was born in the town of Kota Belud of Sabah. She is the second cousin of Salleh Said Keruak.

Political career 
Munirah has been actively involved in politics since 2011 under the People's Justice Party (PKR). She has had always expressed hope that there would be a new chapter for Malaysia with a new government and wanted to be part of the change so that she can bring her hometown more opportunities for development. In 2016, she left the party to join a new Sabah-based Heritage Party (WARISAN). Besides actively in politics, Munirah is also an electrical engineer and is fluent in four languages namely English, Malay, Dusun and Bajau.

Elections

2013 general election 
In the 2013 election, Munirah was fielded by her party, PKR to face Abdul Rahman Dahlan of United Malays National Organisation (UMNO) in the Kota Belud parliamentary seat but lost.

2018 general election 
In the 2018 election, Munirah was again fielded, this time by her new party, WARISAN to contest the Kota Belud parliamentary seat, facing her cousin Salleh Said Keruak from UMNO and subsequently won.

Election results

Honours
  :
  Companion of the Order of Kinabalu (ASDK) (2018)

Advocating for a gender sensitive parliament 
Isnaraissah Munirah Majilis (MP for Kota Belud) was among the 33 women Member of Parliament calling for the Dewan Rakyat to be a gender-sensitive parliament in line with the guidelines of the Inter-Parliamentary Union.

References 

Living people
1982 births
Kadazan-Dusun people
Malaysian Muslims
Bajau people
People from Sabah
Women in Sabah politics
Women members of the Dewan Rakyat
Members of the Dewan Rakyat
Former People's Justice Party (Malaysia) politicians
Sabah Heritage Party politicians
People from Kota Belud District